"Whiskey on You" is a song by American country music singer Nate Smith. It was released in June 2022 as his debut single and the first single from his upcoming self-titled debut album.

History
Smith attended a songwriting retreat with Lindsay Rimes and Russell Sutton in 2022. He recorded a demo of the song in the kitchen of music executive Jim Catino. Smith attempted to make a full version of the song in the studio, but after being unable to find a suitable recording there, he and Rimes decided to use the vocal track from the demo in the final recording.

Music video
The song also received a music video directed by Chris Ashlee, portraying the song's central theme of a breakup.

Chart performance

Weekly charts

Year-end charts

Certifications

References

2022 debut singles
Nate Smith (singer) songs
Arista Nashville singles
Songs written by Lindsay Rimes